Marta Zaynullina (born 30 July 1990) is a Russian Paralympic cross-country skier and biathlete. She represented Russia at the 2014 Winter Paralympics which was held in her home nation and competed in the cross-country skiing and biathlon events. She claimed a bronze medal in the women's 1km sprint sitting classic event during the 2014 Winter Paralympics. She also competed as a neutral athlete in the 2018 Winter Paralympics.

Biography 
Marta Zaynullina was born on the 30th of July, 1990 in Nizhnekamsk as a twin child just a few minutes after her twin brother's birth. At the age of 14, she  was found to have a Malignant tumour in her hip which eventually caused amputation to her legs. She was advised by the fellow Russian Paralympic cross-country skier, Irina Polyakova to take the sport of Paralympic cross-country skiing who later went onto become an official coach to Marta Zaynullina.

Honours
Zaynullina has received several awards for her performance in the winter Paralympic games. She was given the Order for Merit to the Fatherland class II in 2014 in recognition of her achievements at the 2014 Paralympics.
In 2018, she received two further honours for her performance in the 2018 Winter Paralympics:
the Order "For Merit to the Fatherland" class I  and award from the Republic of Tatarstan.

References

External links 
 

1990 births
Living people
Russian female cross-country skiers
Russian female biathletes
Paralympic cross-country skiers of Russia
Paralympic biathletes of Russia
Cross-country skiers at the 2014 Winter Paralympics
Cross-country skiers at the 2018 Winter Paralympics
Biathletes at the 2014 Winter Paralympics
Biathletes at the 2018 Winter Paralympics
Medalists at the 2014 Winter Paralympics
Medalists at the 2018 Winter Paralympics
Paralympic bronze medalists for Russia
People from Nizhnekamsk
Paralympic medalists in cross-country skiing
Paralympic medalists in biathlon
Sportspeople from Tatarstan
20th-century Russian women
21st-century Russian women